Star Sapphire is the name of several fictional characters in DC Comics; many of them are villainous, and all connected in origin. Within DC continuity, an immortal race of warrior women (the Zamarons) were depicted as having the ancient tradition of choosing physically identical mortals from across the cosmos to serve as the host body for their queen. The woman chosen to serve this queen is called Star Sapphire. She is given the queen's symbolic weapon: a crystal resembling an actual star sapphire that grants the user powers similar to the power ring of Green Lanterns.

In the 2000s the term came to refer to the Star Sapphires, an organization whose members in part include women previously depicted as the singular Star Sapphire in DC titles. Not clearly defined as superheroes or supervillains, the Star Sapphires debuted as a corps in Green Lantern (vol. 4) #20 (July 2007). They were created by writer Geoff Johns and artist Ethan Van Sciver.

Fictional character biography

Golden Age Star Sapphire

The first version of the character appears in All-Flash Comics #32 (Dec–Jan 1947) and Comic Cavalcade #29 (Oct–Nov 1948) and battles the Golden Age Flash. This Star Sapphire claims to be a queen from the 7th Dimension, and attempts to conquer Earth by destroying all the plant life, which would cause the world to run out of oxygen.

A later retcon connects her with the Zamaron Star Sapphires, explaining that she had been chosen as Queen of the Zamarons, but had proved unworthy, hence her banishment to the 7th dimension. In this story, she attempts to manipulate Carol Ferris into using the Star Sapphire stone to destroy the Zamarons. The Flash is able to break the connection. This was the Golden Age character's sole modern appearance.

Carol Ferris

Carol Ferris is first introduced in S.O.S. Green Lantern!, which ran in Showcase #22 (October 1959). In her original appearance, Hal Jordan becomes employed at Ferris Aircraft and (after asking her to dinner) she makes it clear that she does not date employees. However, she would go on to play an on and off romantic role in his life. She first appears as the second Star Sapphire in Green Lantern (vol. 2) #16 (October 1962). As Star Sapphire, she battles Green Lantern for many years, because the Zamarons want to prove men are inferior. When she is first defeated by him they take away her memory of the event, but the persona keeps resurfacing. When Jordan becomes the Spectre, he removes the Star Sapphire persona from Ferris. While seeking to inhabit the body that Jordan most desires, the Star Sapphire gem again possesses her for a brief period during the Mystery of the Star Sapphire story line. Her reunion with the Star Sapphire entity is short, however, as it soon learns that Jordan most desires Jillian Pearlman and as a result abandons Ferris. Though she no longer holds the singular position of Star Sapphire, in Green Lantern (vol. 4) #38 (March 2009), she receives a violet power ring sent to her by the Zamarons. It attaches itself to her, and she leaves for Zamaron to be inducted as a member of the Star Sapphire Corps. As the Queen dies at the end of Green Lantern (vol. 4) #57 (October 2010), Carol is named queen by her predecessor.

Dela Pharon
Dela Pharon was introduced as the third woman to hold the position of Star Sapphire in Green Lantern (vol. 2) #41 (December 1965). Technically speaking, however, Carol Ferris simultaneously appears as Star Sapphire in the same issue.

In the story, Ferris is injured testing out one of her new flying machines, and is brought to the hospital for treatment. However, she awakens and finds herself drawn away from the hospital. It is shown that Ferris is being lured off by the Star Sapphire gem, and upon finding it she once again takes on the mantle of Star Sapphire. As Star Sapphire she returns to pursuing her quest to marry Green Lantern; however, conflict arises with the arrival of an alien woman who also appears to be the Zamaron's queen and Star Sapphire. Jordan discovers Ferris' transformation upon finding her fighting the second, alien, Star Sapphire. The Zamarons arrive to meet Jordan and explain that Dela Pharon (from the planet Xanador) is the woman that Ferris is fighting.
 
Before the events of the issue, the Zamarons chose Pharon as their new queen and recipient of the Star Sapphire, but a dissenting group of Zamarons claimed that Ferris would have made a superior queen. Angered by the opposition, Pharon travels to Earth and attacks Ferris in retaliation (which was the cause of her aircraft malfunction). Recognizing the attack provokes Ferris to become Star Sapphire again and defend herself. At the conclusion of their duel, Ferris appears to be the victor and leaves to challenge Jordan. Following his defeat, she forces him to travel with her to Zamaron and become her husband. Before the wedding, Jordan discovers that the woman he believed to be Ferris is really Pharon in disguise. Jordan finds the real Ferris living Pharon's life on Xanador, and brings her to Zamaron. He defeats Pharon and returns with Ferris to Earth without her retaining any knowledge of the events that transpired.

Dela Pharon reappears in a story told by Carol Ferris during the Mystery of the Star Sapphire story line. She continues to serve as Star Sapphire after her first appearance, and eventually both falls in love with and enslaves the Green Lantern of Xanador. After becoming his mate, she kills him and encases their planet in violet crystal so that they will be together until the end of time. This presumably leaves her encased in crystal during the events currently enfolding in Green Lantern and Green Lantern Corps. However, promotional imagery included in Blackest Night #0 (March 2009) lists her as a prominent member of the newly formed Star Sapphires. What role she will play among the corps is unknown.

Deborah Camille Darnell

Remoni-Notra, of the planet Pandina, is chosen by the Zamarons to be their queen, an honor previously bequeathed upon Earth's Carol Ferris, but refuses. Remoni-Notra is given one of the five star sapphire gems and is told of the existence of the other four. Using her powers, she comes to Earth to locate and steal Carol Ferris' gem and joins the Secret Society of Super Villains as the new Star Sapphire in hopes of finding a clue to the gem. On Earth, she takes the name Deborah Camille Darnell and becomes a stewardess at Ferris Aircraft, in hopes of getting closer to Carol and the Star Sapphire gem. As Star Sapphire, Darnell can use her gem of power to fly and to hurl blasts of force nearly equal to the power of a Green Lantern's ring. Moreover, the Sapphire bestows upon her a certain amount of invulnerability and allows her to survive in airless space.

As Debbie Darnell, she often dates long-time hero Captain Comet. She also portrays a French real estate agent named Camille on Earth. She is later mind-wiped and put in a coma. She was most likely mind-wiped at the request of Green Lantern Hal Jordan to protect Carol Ferris. She is revived by her teammates in the Secret Society.

In Geoff Johns' run on "Green Lantern", her origin is rebooted: she is presented as a flight attendant who dated Hal Jordan when he broke up with Carol Ferris and, thus, was chosen to be the new Star Sapphire, since the crystal is used to possess Hal's girlfriends. Later, in Infinite Crisis #6, several magic-users assemble at Stonehenge and summon the Spectre. He singles out Darnell, condemns her, transforms her into a star sapphire and shatters her, killing her.

Jillian Pearlman

The fourth child of a Texan rancher, Jillian enlists to the United States Air Force after she turns nineteen. Her sharp wit, attitude, and Texan accent earns her the call sign "Cowgirl." Jillian meets Hal Jordan's alter-ego, Green Lantern, after he saves her life when the engine of her jet is failing and later meets Jordan face to face at Edwards Air Force Base. Jordan and Jillian feel a romantic attraction to each other, and eventually realize that they have a lot in common.

During the lost year, Cowgirl, Hal "Highball" Jordan, and Shane "Rocket-Man" Sellers are sent on an Air Force mission, on which Jordan does not wear his Green Lantern ring. During the mission all three of their jets are shot down and the pilots taken as prisoners of war. Jordan files down his chains in an attempt to escape the camp, finally doing so when his captors attempt to torture Cowgirl in front of him to get him to reveal secrets, since torturing Jordan himself does not work. Cowgirl and Jordan use the surprise to overcome their jailers, locate Rocket-Man, flee the camp, and eventually make it to a campsite and a hospital. Upon their return to America they are awarded POW medals in a ceremony interrupted by a ship piloted by Tomar-Tu crashing to Earth. When the three recovered POWs are put back on active Air Force duty, it is done so on the condition that they attend therapy sessions. All three skip the sessions, deciding instead to get together at Pancho's, the station bar, and work through it.

Just 24 hours after being re-activated, Cowgirl is sent on a mission alongside pilots "Sugarsnap" and "Whims" to take down the same group of terrorists that took her captive. During the mission, her jet is hit and the Air Force looses contact, causing Jordan to go after her in his Green Lantern guise. When he makes it to the crash site and nearby camp there is no sign of her, the terrorists having immediately taken off with her in a jeep when they realize the Green Lantern was coming. Cowgirl yanks the steering wheel, sending the jeep into a tree and herself into a frozen lake, from which she is saved by Hal Jordan, whom she recognizes beneath the mask. As he attempts to heal her with his power ring numerous bounty hunters attack him, until John Stewart, undercover as Hunger Dog, "captures" him and deposits Cowgirl in a hospital.

When the Star Sapphire gem resurfaces, hosted by Carol Ferris, it attacks Cowgirl at Pancho's to get to Jordan before realizing that Jordan has feelings for her. The Star Sapphire jumps hosts to Cowgirl and chases Jordan through the city as he tries to tire her out, eventually knocking him into a "Honeymoon Hotel". Jordan covers Ferris with a Green Lantern "suit" and the two battle, with Jordan finally pinning Cowgirl under a car and prying the Sapphire off of her. Four Zamarons step out of the portal, and one says that both Cowgirl and Ferris will become the first two members of their Corps.

Jordan then tells Ferris to attempt to remove the Star Sapphire from Cowgirl while he confronts the Zamarons. Though she is able to do so, the stone immobilizes both her and Cowgirl while the Zamarons gain the upper hand over Jordan. The stone asks Jordan which of the two women he desires most, and that the woman he chooses will be able to be with him forever. In response, Jordan kisses one of the Zamarons which in turn convinces the stone to release its hostages and possess the Zamaron Jordan kissed instead. The stone reacts with its new host violently, prompting the Zamarons to retreat to their home planet.

Pearlman resides in Coast City, living with Hal Jordan. She most recently appears at the beginning of the Blackest Night storyline, performing a "fly-by" with the Green Lanterns of Earth for Coast City's "memorial day".

Nol-Anj

A new villainous Star Sapphire debuts in Green Lantern (vol. 5) #21 (August 2013). Prixiam Nol-Anj is a former prisoner of the Oan sciencells, imprisoned for a slew of different crimes: racketeering, smuggling, extortion, murder for hire, abduction, trafficking in organisms, larceny, grand theft starship, and assault with an energy weapon. Over time, she uses her wiles to beguile her guard, a Green Lantern named Cossite, and he falls in love with her. When Larfleeze attacks Oa in the aftermath of the First Lantern's defeat and the death of the Guardians, his constructs kill a Star Sapphire who arrived to aid in the defense of the planet. The fallen Sapphire's ring flies to Nol-Anj's cell, where it declares her eligible to become a Star Sapphire herself. Nol-Anj persuades Cossite that the ring's presence is proof that her love for him is true, and he readily opens the door and allows her to slip the ring onto her fingers and acquire its power. To his understandable shock, she then kills him, declaring that the love in her heart that the ring detected was not for him, but for the Clann she belonged to, that accepted her when no one else would.

After Larfleeze's attack is thwarted, Hal and the rest of the Lanterns discover Cossite's body and learn of Nol-Anj's escape, who had by then commandeered a spacecraft and left for space sector 0563. This is the home base for her clann, the Braidmen, a group of scavengers and contraband pirates, of which she is the "Prixiam". As Prixiam, she serves similarly as would a queen. The love for her clann is so potent, Nol-Anj has been shown to have the ability to extend her violet powers to shatter green constructs and summon/control multiple members of the Braidmen across great distances.

Star Sapphires
The Star Sapphires are one of the seven Corps empowered by a specific color of the emotional spectrum within the DC Universe. Though their roots can be traced back to the earliest appearances of the Star Sapphire] queens, they have entered into a significant plot role as part of the 2009–2010 Blackest Night crossover event. First formed by the Zamarons at the conclusion of the Mystery of the Star Sapphire storyline running in Green Lantern (vol. 4) issues #18–20 (May–July 2007), their abilities come from violet power rings which wield the power of love. Initially the members of the Star Sapphires were only depicted as being females, during the Blackest Night panel at Comic Con International 2009, Geoff Johns explained that: "anyone can join, but most men are not worthy." More recently male recruits were shown among the Star Sapphires when Wonder Woman visited their home planet.

Powers and abilities

Star Sapphire gem
The original Star Sapphire's powers are vast. She is equipped with an arsenal of weapons, including a replicate Zamaron star sapphire, of unknown origin. She also has a variety of personal powers, though whether they stem from herself or her personal armament is unclear. She is also able to access the memories of the Zamorans regarding the Star Sapphire gem, such as the experiences of other wearers. As with the powers of the woman bearing the title of Star Sapphire, the limitations of the Star Sapphire gem are also unclear. Psychologically, the women serving as Star Sapphire have displayed a bizarre preoccupation with gender, suspected of reflecting a pathological fear of men. They also have had a less than accurate grasp of the variations in physics between dimensions. They are sometimes foiled primarily due to their own overconfidence. The Star Sapphire gems used to power the original incarnations of Star Sapphire were used by the Zamarons to create the main violet Power Battery. invulnerability, light speed, superhuman strength and telekinesis.

Other versions
In the Elseworlds one-shot "Batman: In Darkest Knight", where Bruce Wayne (rather than Hal Jordan) is granted Abin Sur's Power ring, Selina Kyle is granted powers by Sinestro; calling herself Star Sapphire. Though never outright stated to be Kyle, the story strongly hints at her identity: Binary Star (a similarly powered Harvey Dent) says "You have the eyes of a cat, Star Sapphire," and Bruce recognizes her as "that woman I met in the bar. I nearly died that night", a reference to the events of Batman: Year One.
In the Tangent Comics fifth-week event, a woman with the name Star Sapphire is a member of that world's version of the Doom Patrol.
In the universe prior to the current one, groups managed to tap into the wellspring of power created by the Emotional Spectrum. In this universe those who tapped into the violet light were known as the Lightsmiths of the Violet Light of Passion.

In other media

Television

 Star Sapphire appears in series set in the DC Animated Universe (DCAU), voiced by Olivia d'Abo. While her origins are never elaborated upon and her identity is never stated on-screen, the show's creators have confirmed she is intended to be Carol Ferris.
 Star Sapphire first appears in Justice League. In the episode "Injustice For All", she joins Lex Luthor's Injustice Gang in the hopes of destroying the Justice League, only to be defeated by Green Lantern. In the episode "Fury", Star Sapphire joins Aresia's Injustice Gang to kill the world's men, only to be defeated by Wonder Woman. Star Sapphire also makes a minor appearance in the two-part episode "Hereafter".
 Star Sapphire also appears in Justice League Unlimited as a member of Gorilla Grodd's Secret Society. Prior to and during the events of the episodes "Alive!" and "Destroyer", Luthor takes control of the Society, but Grodd mounts a mutiny. In the ensuing battle, Star Sapphire sides with Luthor before Darkseid attacks and kills most of the Society. Following this, Luthor, Star Sapphire, and their remaining allies join forces with the Justice League to foil Darkseid's invasion of Earth.
 The Carol Ferris incarnation of Star Sapphire appears in Batman: The Brave and the Bold, voiced by Rachel Quaintance and Vicki Lewis respectively. This version is abducted by the Zamarons, who imbued their queen's spirit into her and bestow her with a violet power ring, which causes Ferris to lose control of her body.
 The Carol Ferris incarnation of Star Sapphire appears in Green Lantern: The Animated Series.
 The Carol Ferris incarnation of Star Sapphire appears in Justice League Action.
 The Carol Ferris incarnation of Star Sapphire appears in DC Super Hero Girls, voiced again by Kari Wahlgren.

Film
 Carol Ferris and Star Sapphire appear in Justice League: The New Frontier.
 The Carol Ferris incarnation of Star Sapphire appears in Justice League: Doom, voiced again by Olivia d'Abo. This version became Star Sapphire after Green Lantern broke her heart in an unspecified manner and developed a desire to kill him ever since, which leads to her joining Vandal Savage's Legion of Doom.
Christina Wren plays Capt. Carrie Ferris, is a United States Air Force officer and the assistant to General Swanwick in Man of Steel, Batman v Superman Dawn of Justice, and Suicide Squad.
 Star Sapphire appears in DC Super Hero Girls: Hero of the Year.
 The Carol Ferris incarnation of Star Sapphire appears in Teen Titans Go! & DC Super Hero Girls: Mayhem in the Multiverse, with Kari Wahlgren reprising her role. This version is a member of the Legion of Doom.

Video games

 The Carol Ferris incarnation of Star Sapphire appears as support cards in Injustice 2.
 Star Sapphire appears as a playable character in Lego Batman 3: Beyond Gotham and Lego DC Super-Villains.

Web series
Star Sapphire appears in DC Super Hero Girls, voiced by Jessica DiCicco.

References

External links
Golden Age Queen of the 7th Dimension:
 Star Sapphire I
 The Golden Age Star Sapphire

Remoni-Notra:
 The Unofficial Star Sapphire IV (Remoni-Notra/Deborah 'Debbie' Camille Darnell) Biography

Jillian Pearlman:
Jillian "Cowgirl" Pearlman comicbookdb

Animated:
 JLU Animated Profile - Toonzone.net

Miscellaneous:
 The Star Sapphire Tutorial

Characters created by Lee Elias
Characters created by Robert Kanigher
Characters created by Geoff Johns
Characters created by Gerry Conway
Characters created by Gil Kane
Characters created by John Broome
Comics characters introduced in 1947
Comics characters introduced in 1962
Comics characters introduced in 1965
Comics characters introduced in 1976
DC Comics female superheroes
DC Comics female supervillains
DC Comics superhero teams
Fictional characters with energy-manipulation abilities
Fictional characters who can manipulate light
Fictional murderers
Fictional queens
Golden Age supervillains
Green Lantern characters
Articles about multiple fictional characters
Villains in animated television series